Numancia de la Sagra is a municipality located in the province of Toledo, Castile-La Mancha, Spain. According to the 2021 census (INE), the municipality has a population of 5,170 inhabitants.

Originally named Azaña (from medieval Latin Façania), it was captured by the Numancia regiment in 1936 during  the  Spanish Civil War, and was renamed by the Francoist regime to remove the association with the Republican president Manuel Azaña.

References

Municipalities in the Province of Toledo